Wakatsutomu Hiroki (born 13 February 1973 as Hiroki Nakao, わかつとむ ひろき) is a former sumo wrestler from Ichikawa, Chiba, Japan. He made his professional debut in November 1995 and reached the top division in May 2001. His highest rank was maegashira 12. He retired from the sumo world in July 2006.

Career record

See also
List of sumo tournament second division champions
Glossary of sumo terms
List of past sumo wrestlers

References

1973 births
Living people
Japanese sumo wrestlers
Sumo people from Chiba Prefecture